Diego Alejandro Olate Jeria (born 11 January 1987) is a Chilean former footballer who played as a centre back.

Club career
He won his first professional honour in 2009 with Colo-Colo after reach Torneo Clausura title under orders of Hugo Tocalli, with who was a regular starter.

In 2014, he joined Swedish second-tier team Husqvarna FF, being his first international experience.

Honours

Club
Colo-Colo
 Primera División de Chile: 2009 Clausura

References

External links

1987 births
Living people
People from Rancagua
Chilean footballers
Chilean expatriate footballers
Primera B de Chile players
Chilean Primera División players
Superettan players
Segunda División Profesional de Chile players
O'Higgins F.C. footballers
Colo-Colo footballers
Ñublense footballers
C.D. Antofagasta footballers
Santiago Morning footballers
Deportes Copiapó footballers
Husqvarna FF players
Deportes La Serena footballers
Deportes Colchagua footballers
Lautaro de Buin footballers
Chilean expatriate sportspeople in Sweden
Expatriate footballers in Sweden
Association football defenders